This is the complete list of number-one singles in Turkey in 2021 according to Radiomonitor. The list on the left side of the box (Resmi Liste, "the Official List") represents physical and digital track sales as well as music streaming of the Turkish artists, and the one on the right side (Uluslararası Liste, "the International List") is the same thing for non-Turkish artists.

Chart history

Notes

References

External links
Official Twitter page of Radiomonitor Turkey

2021 in Turkey
Turkey
2021